In mathematics, a non-measurable set is a set which cannot be assigned a meaningful "volume".  The mathematical existence of such sets is construed to provide information about the notions of length, area and volume in formal set theory. In Zermelo–Fraenkel set theory, the axiom of choice entails that non-measurable subsets of  exist.

The notion of a non-measurable set has been a source of great controversy since its introduction. Historically, this led Borel and Kolmogorov to formulate probability theory on sets which are constrained to be measurable. The measurable sets on the line are iterated countable unions and intersections of intervals (called Borel sets) plus-minus null sets. These sets are rich enough to include every conceivable definition of a set that arises in standard mathematics, but they require a lot of formalism to prove that sets are measurable.

In 1970, Robert M. Solovay constructed the Solovay model, which shows that it is consistent with standard set theory without uncountable choice,  that all subsets of the reals are measurable. However, Solovay's result depends on the existence of an inaccessible cardinal, whose existence and consistency cannot be proved within standard set theory.

Historical constructions
The first indication that there might be a problem in defining length for an arbitrary set came from Vitali's theorem. A more recent combinatorial construction which is similar to the construction by Robin Thomas of a non-Lebesgue measurable set with some additional properties appeared in American Mathematical Monthly. 

One would expect the measure of the union of two disjoint sets to be the sum of the measure of the two sets. A measure with this natural property is called finitely additive. While a finitely additive measure is sufficient for most intuition of area, and is analogous to Riemann integration, it is considered insufficient for probability, because conventional modern treatments of sequences of events or random variables demand countable additivity.

In this respect, the plane is similar to the line;  there is a finitely additive measure, extending Lebesgue measure, which is invariant under all isometries. For higher dimensions the picture gets worse. The Hausdorff paradox and Banach–Tarski paradox show that a three-dimensional ball of radius 1 can be dissected into 5 parts which can be reassembled to form two balls of radius 1.

Example
Here  is countable (more specifically,  is isomorphic to ) while  is uncountable. The set of those translates partitions the circle into a countable collection of disjoint sets, which are all pairwise congruent (by rational rotations). The set  will be non-measurable for any rotation-invariant countably additive probability measure on : if  has zero measure, countable additivity would imply that the whole circle has zero measure. If  has positive measure, countable additivity would show that the circle has infinite measure.

Consistent definitions of measure and probability
The Banach–Tarski paradox shows that there is no way to define volume in three dimensions unless one of the following five concessions is made:
 The volume of a set might change when it is rotated.
 The volume of the union of two disjoint sets might be different from the sum of their volumes.
 Some sets might be tagged "non-measurable", and one would need to check whether a set is "measurable" before talking about its volume.
 The axioms of ZFC (Zermelo–Fraenkel set theory with the axiom of choice) might have to be altered.

Standard measure theory takes the third option. One defines a family of measurable sets, which is very rich, and almost any set explicitly defined in most branches of mathematics will be among this family. It is usually very easy to prove that a given specific subset of the geometric plane is measurable.  The fundamental assumption is that a countably infinite sequence of disjoint sets satisfies the sum formula, a property  called σ-additivity.

In 1970, Solovay demonstrated that the existence of a non-measurable set for the Lebesgue measure is not provable within the framework of Zermelo–Fraenkel set theory in the absence of an additional axiom (such as the axiom of choice), by showing that (assuming the consistency of an inaccessible cardinal) there is a model of ZF, called Solovay's model,  in which countable choice holds, every set is Lebesgue measurable and in which the full axiom of choice fails.

The axiom of choice is equivalent to a fundamental result of point-set topology, Tychonoff's theorem, and also to the conjunction of two fundamental results of functional analysis, the Banach–Alaoglu theorem and the Krein–Milman theorem. It also affects the study of infinite groups to a large extent, as well as ring and order theory (see Boolean prime ideal theorem). However, the axioms of determinacy and dependent choice together are sufficient for most geometric measure theory, potential theory, Fourier series and Fourier transforms, while making all subsets of the real line Lebesgue-measurable.

See also

References

Notes

Bibliography

Measure theory